Kunowice (() is a village in the administrative district of Gmina Słubice, within Słubice County, Lubusz Voivodeship, in western Poland, near the Oder river and the German border.

In 2008 the village had a population of 700.

History
Kunersdorf was first documented in 1337 as part of the Neumark region (Terra trans Oderam) in eastern Brandenburg. Elector Jobst of Luxembourg sold it to the City of Frankfurt in 1399. It was devastated by the troops of Duke Jan II the Mad of Żagań on his 1477 expedition against the Brandenburg elector Albert Achilles of Hohenzollern and again by Imperial as well as Swedish forces during the Thirty Years' War.

During the Seven Years' War, the village was occupied by Russian forces after the Prussian defeat at the 1759 Battle of Kay. On 12 August 1759 at the Battle of Kunersdorf, the Prussian Army of King Frederick II was destroyed by the united Russian and Austrian forces under Count Pyotr Saltykov.

In 1815 after the Napoleonic Wars Kunerdorf belonged to the newly created Prussian Province of Brandenburg. With Prussia it became part of the German Empire in 1871 during the unification of Germany, and from 1873 on was administered within the Weststernberg district with its capital at Drossen. The village was conquered by the Red Army during the Vistula–Oder Offensive in February 1945. Since the implementation of the Oder-Neisse line by the 1945 Potsdam Agreement, Kunowice has been part of Poland.

Transportation
After 1945, Kunowice station was the site of a railroad border crossing on the line from Poznań to Frankfurt, until in 2003 a new station was opened at the border town of Słubice.

Kunowice's railway station appeared in the 2004 German film Distant Lights (Lichter).

References

Kunowice
Germany–Poland border crossings